This is a recap of the 1999 season for the Professional Bowlers Association (PBA) Tour.  It was the tour's 41st season, and consisted of 26 events.

Parker Bohn III collected five titles during the season to take PBA Player of the Year honors, ending Walter Ray Williams, Jr.'s streak of three straight POY awards.

Tim Criss secured a major title at the PBA National Championship. Amateur Brian Boghosian took the title at the ABC Masters, while Bob Learn, Jr. won his first career major at Bowling's U.S. Open. Jason Couch collected $100,000 in winning the season-ending Brunswick World Tournament of Champions among his two titles on the year.

During the season, Steve Jaros and Mike Miller rolled the 13th and 14th (respectively) televised 300 games in PBA history. Another highlight of the season was the PBA's first-ever outdoor finals at the NYC PBA Experience, which took place on specially-built lanes in mid-town Manhattan's Bryant Park.

Tournament schedule

References

External links
1999 Season Schedule

Professional Bowlers Association seasons
1999 in bowling